The Rural Municipality of Louise is a former rural municipality (RM) in the Canadian province of Manitoba. It was originally incorporated as a rural municipality on February 14, 1880. It ceased on January 1, 2015 as a result of its provincially mandated amalgamation with the Town of Pilot Mound and the Village of Crystal City to form the Municipality of Louise.

The former RM is located in the southern part of the province, on the border with the state of North Dakota in the United States. The 2006 Census reported a population of 819 persons, a 17.2% decline from the 2001 Census figure of 989 persons.

Geography 
According to Statistics Canada, the former RM had an area of 932.67 km2 (360.11 sq mi).

Communities 
 Clearwater
 Fallison
 Purves
 Wood Bay

Adjacent municipalities 
Rural Municipality of Roblin - (west)
Rural Municipality of Argyle - (northwest)
Rural Municipality of Lorne - (north)
Rural Municipality of Pembina - (northeast & east)
Cavalier County, North Dakota - (south)
Towner County, North Dakota - (southwest)

References

External links 
 Official website
 Map of Louise R.M. at Statcan

Louise
Populated places disestablished in 2015
2015 disestablishments in Manitoba